Cathryn Bristow (born 14 November 1984) is a New Zealand professional golfer.

College career
Bristow played for the Oregon Ducks.

Professional career
She is a three-time winner on the ALPG Tour – once in 2012 and twice in 2016. She also won the Pennsylvania Classic on the Futures Tour in 2011.

Bristow has played on the Ladies European Tour since 2013.

2016 Olympics
Bristow earned an Olympic qualification spot by finishing in the 11 July 2016 world rankings at 446th. However, she was not selected by her National Olympic Committee.

Professional wins

ALPG Tour wins
2011/12 Moss Vale Golf Club ALPG Pro-Am
2016 Mulpha Norwest ALPG Pro Am, Northern Beaches Classic

Futures Tour wins
2011 Pennsylvania Classic

Team appearances
Amateur
Espirito Santo Trophy (representing New Zealand): 2008
Queen Sirikit Cup (representing New Zealand): 2008

Professional
The Queens (representing Australia): 2016, 2017

References

External links
 
 
 

New Zealand female golfers
Oregon Ducks women's golfers
ALPG Tour golfers
Ladies European Tour golfers
Left-handed golfers
Golfers from Auckland
1984 births
Living people